Imp Kerr (born June 6, 1980, Uppsala, Sweden) is a Swedish-French artist living in New York City, mostly known for her fake American Apparel advertisement campaign. She is The New Inquiry's creative director, and runs the blog The New Shelton Wet/Dry.

Early life and education
Kerr spent her childhood and teenage years in Paris, France. She moved to New York in 1999, where she graduated from NYU with a degree in magazine journalism and a minor in philosophy. Kerr has a sister, Rosa, who is three years older than she is.

Some bits of Kerr's life were documented on her blog "stereohell", but most of the content was taken off at the end of 2009. The same content was then reposted, in a fragmented and augmented version, on "shines like gold," an experimental blog she runs for The New Inquiry.

Fake American Apparel ads
In 2007, Kerr started a fake American Apparel ad campaign in New York, which was covered on several blogs. "For the uninitiated, over the past few months, a NYC prankster has created several bawdy two-color parodies of AA ads complete with real ad headlines." On September 9, 2008, a video posted on Stereohell.com revealed that the fake ads were Photoshop mockups, something nobody had suspected for one year. American Apparel ran a tribute ad on the back cover of Vice magazine (November, 2008), showing a compilation of the fake ads.

Wall Street Casino
In December, 2008, Imp Kerr created a set of architectural drawings portraying investment banks as Las Vegas casinos.

Imp Kerr's vision was confirmed by the New York Times, in an editorial titled "Wall Street Casino," published on April 28, 2010: "Banks like Goldman turned the financial system into a casino. Like gambling, the transactions mostly just shifted money around."

The drawings were shown in the group exhibition Spacer:One at the Tribeca Grand in New York (2010)  and featured in n+1 Occupy #4, April 2012.

DNA-based prediction of Nietzsche's voice

In 2015, Imp Kerr conceptualized a protocol designed to predict the voice of a deceased person (philosopher Friedrich Nietzsche in the case study) based on genotype data. To generate the voice, a vocal tract and larynx were 3D-printed. In 2020, researchers used a similar procedure to recreate the voice of a 3,000-year-old Egyptian mummy -- by 3D-printing a replica of his vocal tract. 

Imp Kerr study was covered and presented as real on the Canadian public radio CBC during the show As It Happens on March 20, 2015, and commented as a "piece of performance art" elsewhere. "Impressed with the scientific imaginativeness and attention to detail — the artist knows the relevant science (and has a terrific ear for the conventions of scientific communication)," wrote Jason Eisner, Professor at Johns Hopkins University.

References

External links
 The New Shelton wet/dry
 Imp Kerr on the New Inquiry
 Gawker articles about the Fake AA campaign
 Animal New York articles about the Fake AA campaign
 Copyranter articles about the Fake AA campaign
 Impkerr.com
 Article about Imp Kerr on Beautiful Decay
 Shines Like Gold on Salon.com
 Imp Kerr, Supermarket of Art, The Daily, 2011

21st-century American artists
Artists from New York City
Culture jamming
Hoaxes in the United States
Advertising and marketing controversies
1980 births
Living people
Swedish expatriates in the United States